Soon Fasting (stylized as SoonFasting), also known as Soon, is an intermittent fasting, health tracker and dieting app, developed by Soon Health. It is available for Android and iOS devices.

Overview 
SoonFasting is an educational smartphone application for intermittent fasting, health tracking and dieting, with coach consultation, personalized plans, recipes, and training programs. The app has ability to track users intermittent fasting and eating habits, and make personalized lifestyle plans. It uses gamification elements and allows users chat function, for motivation and engagement. Intermittent fasting in the app, includes 12:12, 14:10, 16:8, 17:7, 18:6, 20:4, and 23:1 plans. The health tracker in the app, can monitor food, weight, steps, and water.

It source and integrate data with the health app.

History 
SoonFasting is developed by a San Jose based digital health company, Soon Health. The app is available for iOS and Android devices. The iOS version of the app was launched in September 2022.

Availability 
SoonFasting app is available for iOS and Android users, in English language.

See also
Fasting and longevity
Fitness app
Intermittent fasting

References

External links

Fitness apps
Health software
Activity trackers
Cross-platform mobile software
Application software
IOS software
Android (operating system) software
2022 software
Gamification